Chexbres railway station may refer to the following in Switzerland:

Chexbres-Village railway station, in Chexbres, canton of Vaud, Switzerland
former names of Puidoux railway station, in Puidoux (near Chexbres):
Chexbres railway station (until 1904)
Puidoux-Chexbres railway station (1904-2018)

 de:Bahnhof Chexbres